Philip Williams (by 1519 – 1558 or later), of Ipswich, Suffolk, was an English politician.

Family
Williams is thought to have been the third son of Francis Williams. The family are thought to have originally been from Wales.

He was a successful merchant in 1545. He may be the Philip Williams alias Footman who in May 1556 gave evidence against ‘such as favoured the gospel at Ipswich’. Williams alias Footman lived into the reign of Elizabeth I and lived in St. Mary Tower, Churchgate, Ipswich.

Williams died without issue.

Career
He was a Member of Parliament (MP) for Ipswich in 1558.

References

Year of birth missing
Year of death unknown
16th-century deaths
Members of the Parliament of England (pre-1707) for Ipswich
16th-century merchants
English merchants
English MPs 1558